Isaías Lucero is a Regional Mexican singer. He was previously the lead vocalist of norteño band Los Invasores de Nuevo León, but left for a solo career with EMI Records in 1999.

References

Mexican male singers
Norteño musicians
20th-century births
Year of birth missing (living people)
Living people
Place of birth missing (living people)